Rakita (South and East Slavic for basket willow) may refer to:

Places 
Rakita, Greece, a location in the municipal unit Leontio, Achaea, Greece. It is part of the community of Ano Mazaraki
Olympiada, Greece, a village in northern Greece that was known as Rakita before 1927
Rakita, Serbia, a village in the municipality of Babušnica, Serbia
Rakita, Montenegro, a village in Bijelo Polje Municipality, in northern Montenegro
Rakita, Sofia Province, a village in Slivnitsa Municipality, Sofia Province, western Bulgaria

People 
Mark Rakita (born 1938), Russian two-time Olympic champion sabreur

See also
Rokita (disambiguation)